Sandford is a small village in the Eden district, in the county of Cumbria, England. It is near the A66 road. It has one pub.

Location grid

See also

Listed buildings in Warcop

References

External links
 Cumbria County History Trust: Warcop (nb: provisional research only – see Talk page)

Villages in Cumbria
Warcop